Octave Pradels (15 February 1842 – 30 April 1930) was a French poet, novelist, vaudevilliste and lyricist.

Biography 
Octave Frederick Pradels published his first monologues, tales in verse and songs in 1883.

Among his greatest successes were Ça commençait si gentiment, La Chula, Dans l'oasis,  (written in collaboration with ). His songs were created in particular by Kam-Hill, Anna Judic, Amiati (at the Eldorado) and Thérésa.

A director of the Théâtre des Capucines, Octave Pradels was also president of the SACEM from 1895 to 1898.

After a first marriage in 1865 in Villefranche-sur-Mer, with Angélique Thérèse De Villa-Rey, daughter of a commander of the Monaco Marine, who gave him a first son, Édouard Joseph, Pradels supposedly married the divette Maria Theresa Mirbeau in 1873. They had a son, unrecognized by the mother, Edmond André, born 26 July 1878 in the 17th arrondissement of Paris, who collaborated with his father as lyricist and composer under the pseudonym Edmond Aramis. He died for France in Fort Vaux at Vaux-devant-Damloup (Meuse), 9 April 1916. In 1917 Octave Pradels remarried  with Marie Louise Fransurot.

Octave Pradels took great pride of having given his two sons to France. Imbued with the chauvinist and revanchist mentality that arose after the capitulation in 1871, he contributed throughout his career to the dissemination of this feeling. Evidence is given by this excerpt from the words of this Marche Lorraine written in 1892:
Tes fils n'ont pas dégénéré,
Sol sacré !
Adoré !
Dans leurs veines encore ruisselle
Du sang de la Pucelle !

Paulus's memories 
In 1906, he started helping the singer Paulus to write his memories which would be published from 1907.

Paulus's memoirs were not published as a volume, but via the equivalent of booklets or black and white magazines sold each week. Rich in a sumptuous iconography, these notebooks contain reproductions of the cited figures, scores, but also small contextual ads.

Theatre 
 1887: L'Agent de la sûreté de Marseille, Marpon et Flammarion  Read online
 1905: Agence matrimoniale, coll. Auteurs célèbres, Flammarion 
1886: Chansons, monologues, chansons à dire, fantaisies, préface d'Armand Silvestre, éd. Paul Ollendorff, Paris,  Read online  
1887: Rupture de banc, Librairie théâtrale, Paris,  Read online 
1888: Les Amours de Bidoche, Marpon et Flammarion, Paris,  Read online  
1889: Pour dire entre hommes, Marpon et Flammarion, Paris,  Read online 
1890: Robert Daniel, Flammarion, Paris,  Read online  
1891: Les Desserts gaulois, Marpon et Flammarion, Paris
1907: L'Héritier des Monlardon, Publications littéraires illustrées, Paris,  Read online 
1910: Fleurs de Gaule, poésies gaillardes..., Louis-Michaud, Paris,  Read online
1913: Le Vin et la Chanson, Flammarion, Paris,  Read online

References

Bibliography 
Octave Praedels on Wikisource
 André Chadourne, Les Cafés-concerts, E. Dentu, Paris, 1890  Read online
 Chantal Brunschwig, Louis-Jean Calvet, Jean-Claude Klein, Cent ans de chanson française, coll. Points actuels, Éditions du Seuil, Paris, 1981  (1re éd. reliée)
 Serge Dillaz, La Chanson sous la IIIe République (1870-1940), Tallandier, 1991 

19th-century French novelists
20th-century French novelists
French lyricists
19th-century French poets
20th-century French poets
French theatre managers and producers
Members of the Ligue de la patrie française
1842 births
People from Pas-de-Calais
1930 deaths